In mathematics, more specifically in general topology, the Tychonoff cube is the generalization of the unit cube from the product of a finite number of unit intervals to the product of an infinite, even uncountable number of unit intervals. The Tychonoff cube is named after Andrey Tychonoff, who first considered the arbitrary product of topological spaces and who proved in the 1930s that the Tychonoff cube is compact. Tychonoff later generalized this to the product of collections of arbitrary compact spaces. This result is now known as Tychonoff's theorem and is considered one of the most important results in general topology.

Definition 
Let  denote the unit interval .

The Hilbert cube, is a special case of a Tychonoff cube.

Properties 
The axiom of choice is assumed throughout.

 The Tychonoff cube is compact.
 The Tychonoff cube  is a universal space for every compact space of weight .
 The Tychonoff cube  is a universal space for every Tychonoff space of weight .

See also 
 Long line (topology) – a generalization of the real line from a countable number of line segments [0, 1) laid end-to-end to an uncountable number of such segments.

References 
 Ryszard Engelking, General Topology, Heldermann Verlag, Sigma Series in Pure Mathematics, December 1989, .

Notes 

General topology